Europe Transparent was a political party in the Netherlands. The party's founder, Paul van Buitenen, announced its establishment on 8 April 2004. In the 2004 election to the European Parliament the party gained two seats, after a campaign that cost no more than €4,000. Van Buitenen and the number two on the list, Els de Groen, who has written about corruption scandals in Eastern Europe, joined the European Greens–European Free Alliance party group as independent members. It did not participate anymore since the 2004 election European elections

The party claimed to be non-ideological: they aimed to fight for more open European government, against fraud, corruption and favouring of friends. Because the pursuit of this goal was their primary occupation, they participated only to a limited extent in the normal system of debates, reports, meetings, etc.

Their ultimate goal was to be able to disband themselves when they had made the European Union transparent.

European Election results

References

External links
 Official website 

Green political parties in the Netherlands
Anti-corruption parties
Political parties established in 2004
Political parties disestablished in 2008
Main
2004 establishments in the Netherlands
2008 disestablishments in the Netherlands
Defunct political parties in the Netherlands